The Complete Mike Oldfield is a compilation album by Mike Oldfield, released on 21 October 1985 by Virgin Records in the UK.

The double album is subdivided into four sections, with The instrumental section and The Vocal section containing shorter pieces, and The Complex section and The Live section containing excerpts from Oldfield's longer pieces.

Some versions of the vinyl have fewer or different tracks, with "The Instrumental Section" missing "In Dulci Jubilo" and "Portsmouth", while other versions replaced "Mistake" with "Pictures in the Dark".

Track listing

Side 1 - The Instrumental Section 
 "Arrival" – 2:47
 "William Tell Overture" – 3:55
 "Cuckoo Song" – 3:13
 "In Dulci Jubilo" – 2:50
 "Portsmouth" – 2:02
 "Jungle Gardenia" – 2:37
 "Guilty" – 4:04
 "Blue Peter" – 2:07
 "Waldberg" (The Peak) – 3:24
 "Wonderful Land" – 3:39
 "Etude" (Theme from The Killing Fields) – 3:07

Side 2 - The Vocal Section 
 "Moonlight Shadow" – 3:36
 "Family Man" – 3:47
 "Mistake" – 2:55
 "Five Miles Out" – 4:19
 "Crime of Passion" – 3:37
 "To France" – 4:33
 "Shadow on the Wall" (12" Version) – 5:08

Side 3 - The Complex Section 
 "Excerpt from Ommadawn" – 6:59
 "Excerpt from Tubular Bells" – 7:59
 "Excerpt from Hergest Ridge" – 4:20
 "Excerpt from Incantations" – 4:41
 "Evacuation" (Excerpt from The Killing Fields) – 4:11

Side 4 - The Live Section 
 "Sheba" (Live) – 3:30
 "Mirage" (Live) – 5:12
 "Platinum" (Live) – 14:28
 "Mount Teide" (Live) – 4:34

Certifications

References

External links 
 Mike Oldfield discography - The Complete Mike Oldfield at Tubular.net

Mike Oldfield compilation albums
1985 compilation albums
Virgin Records compilation albums